The 2014 Austrian Figure Skating Championships took place between 18 and 21 December 2013 at the Eisarena Volksgarten in Salzburg. Skaters competed in the disciplines of men's singles, ladies' singles, pair skating, and ice dancing on the senior level. The results were used to choose the Austrian teams to the 2014 Winter Olympics, the 2014 World Championships, and the 2014 European Championships.

Results

Men

Ladies

Pairs

Ice dance

External links
 info at Skate Austria
 2011 Austrian Championships results

Austrian Figure Skating Championships
2013 in figure skating
Figure Skating Championships